Carlos Barron (born 15 January 1942) is a Mexican volleyball player. He competed in the men's tournament at the 1968 Summer Olympics.

References

1942 births
Living people
Mexican men's volleyball players
Olympic volleyball players of Mexico
Volleyball players at the 1968 Summer Olympics
Sportspeople from Cuernavaca